Sixty Years of Arkham House is a bibliography of books published from 1939 to 1999 under the imprints of Arkham House, Mycroft & Moran and Stanton & Lee. It was released in 1999 by Arkham House in an edition of approximately 3,500 copies.  The book updates Thirty Years of Arkham House, 1939-1969: A History and Bibliography adding extensive biographical and bibliographical notes.

References

1999 books
American non-fiction books